Julie the Redhead (French: Julie la rousse) is a 1959 French comedy film directed by Claude Boissol and starring Daniel Gélin, Pascale Petit and Margo Lion. The film's sets were designed by the art director Robert Guisgand.

Cast
 Daniel Gélin as Édouard Lavigne / Jean Lavigne
 Pascale Petit as Julienne Lefebvre / Sa nièce
 Margo Lion as 	Germaine Lavigne, la mère de Jean
 René Blancard as M. Lavigne, le père d'Édouard
 Liliane Patrick as Tamira
 Michel Etcheverry as Le notaire / Notary
 Gabrielle Fontan as 	Mme Michon, la concierge
 Jean Ozenne as 	L'oncle Roger / Uncle Roger
 Frédéric O'Brady as Hamib, l'homme d'affaires 
 Pierre Doris as L'hôtelier / Hotel Manager
 André Thorent as José
 Jocelyne Darche as Violette
 Louis Viret as Le garagiste
 Philippe March as Un invité à la soirée
 Michel as Le costaud du cirque 
 Jacques Dufilho as Le garçon d'hôtel / Waiter
 René-Louis Lafforgue as Max Piccalo
 Irina Demick as Minor role

References

Bibliography
 Katz, Ephraim. The Film Encyclopedia. Crowell, 1979.

External links 
 

1959 films
1959 comedy films
French comedy films
1950s French-language films
Films directed by Claude Boissol
1950s French films
Pathé films

fr:Julie la Rousse (film)